The 2019–20 Tour de Ski was the 14th edition of the Tour de Ski and part of the 2019–20 FIS Cross-Country World Cup. The World Cup stage event began in Lenzerheide, Switzerland on 28 December 2019 and concluded with the Final Climb stage in Val di Fiemme, Italy, on 5 January 2020. The tour was the third tour starting in Lenzerheide. The last stage known as the Final Climb was held as a mass start for the first time. A points standing replaced the sprint standing from previous editions.

Alexander Bolshunov became the overall winner, surpassing Sergey Ustiugov and Johannes Høsflot Klæbo. He became the third Russian to win the Tour de Ski. In women's event the overall winner became Therese Johaug, who won the third Tour de Ski cup in her career. Natalya Nepryayeva was second and defending champion Ingvild Flugstad Østberg finished third.

Schedule

Overall leadership 
Two main individual classifications were contested in the 2019–20 Tour de Ski, as well as a team competition. The most important was the overall standings, calculated by adding each skier's finishing times on each stage. Time bonuses (time subtracted) were awarded at both sprint stages and at intermediate points during mass start stages. In the sprint stages, the winners were awarded 60 bonus seconds, while on mass start stages the first ten skiers past the intermediate point received from 15 seconds to 1 seconds. The skier with the lowest cumulative time would be the overall winner of the Tour de Ski. For the first time in Tour history, the skier leading the overall standings would wear a yellow bib.

The second competition was the points standings, which replaced the sprint competition from past editions. The skiers who received the highest number of points during the Tour would win the points standings. The points available for each stage finish were determined by the stage's type. The leader was identified by a red bib.

The final competition was a team competition. This was calculated using the finishing times of the best two skiers of both genders per team on each stage; the leading team was the team with the lowest cumulative time.

A total of CHF 560,000, both genders included, was awarded in cash prizes in the race. The overall winners of the Tour de Ski received CHF 55,000, with the second and third placed skiers getting CHF 40,000 and CHF 27,500 respectively. All finishers in the top 20 were awarded money. The holders of the overall and points standings would benefit on each stage they led; the final winners of the points standings would be given CHF 6,000. CHF 3,000 was given to the winners of each stage of the race, with smaller amounts given to places 2 and 3.

Final standings

Overall standings

Points standings

Team standings

Stages

Stage 1
28 December 2019, Lenzerheide, Switzerland
No bonus seconds were awarded on this stage.

Stage 2
29 December 2019, Lenzerheide, Switzerland
 Bonus seconds to the 30 skiers that qualifies for the quarter-finals, distributed as following:
 Final: 60–54–48–46–44–42
 Semi-final: 32–30–28–26–24–22
 Quarter-final: 10–10–10–8–8–8–8–8–6–6–6–6–6–4–4–4–4–4

Stage 3
31 December 2019, Toblach, Italy
No bonus seconds were awarded on this stage.

Stage 4
1 January 2020, Toblach, Italy
Pursuit start lists were based only on Stage 3 results (not as in the past on the current Tour de Ski overall standing). In fact, stage 4 finish differences are combined results of stages 3 and 4
No bonus seconds were awarded on this stage.

Stage 5
3 January 2020, Val di Fiemme, Italy

Stage 5 bonus seconds
 Men: 1 intermediate sprint, bonus seconds to the 10 first skiers (15–12–10–8–6–5–4–3–2–1) past the intermediate point.
 Women: 1 intermediate sprint, bonus seconds to the 10 first skiers (15–12–10–8–6–5–4–3–2–1) past the intermediate point.
 No bonus seconds were awarded at the finish

Stage 6
4 January 2020, Val di Fiemme, Italy
 Bonus seconds to the 30 skiers that qualifies for the quarter-finals, distributed as following:
 Final: 60–54–48–46–44–42
 Semi-final: 32–30–28–26–24–22
 Quarter-final: 10–10–10–8–8–8–8–8–6–6–6–6–6–4–4–4–4–4

Stage 7
5 January 2020, Val di Fiemme, Italy

The race for "Fastest of the Day" counts for 2019–20 FIS Cross-Country World Cup points. No bonus seconds are awarded on this stage.

World Cup points distribution 
The table shows the number of 2019–20 FIS Cross-Country World Cup points won in the 2019–20 Tour de Ski for men and women.

References

Sources
 

2019–20 Tour de Ski
2019–20 FIS Cross-Country World Cup
2019 20
2019 in cross-country skiing
2019 in Swiss sport
2019 in Italian sport
2020 in Italian sport
2020 in cross-country skiing
December 2019 sports events in Italy
December 2019 sports events in Switzerland
January 2020 sports events in Switzerland
January 2020 sports events in Italy